Several destructive tornadoes struck the Lower Mississippi Valley and the Southeastern United States on February 13, 1952. Multiple intense tornadoes touched down throughout the day, three of which were killers. The worst one was an F4 tornado that touched down in south central Tennessee, killing three and injuring 44. In all, the outbreak killed five, injured 102, and caused $6.402 million (1952 USD) in damage.

Meteorological synopsis
A fast-moving low-pressure system formed over Northern California on February 11. As it moved quickly eastward another low formed over northeastern New Mexico on February 12. These lows moved in tandem into Oklahoma on February 13 and triggered a severe weather outbreak in the Southeastern United States starting that morning.

Confirmed tornadoes

February 13 event

Marble Hill–Beech Hill–Marble Plains–Decherd, Tennessee

This violent tornado developed from the same supercell that produced two prior tornadoes in Lincoln County. It touched down just west of the Moore–Franklin county line near Lois and moved eastward. It first struck areas along SR 50 in Marble Hill causing catastrophic damage. It destroyed 23 homes and outbuildings and damaged 27 others, affecting 20 families. Hundreds of trees were also downed in Moore County. The tornado then moved into Franklin County and obliterated parts of Beech Hill where a church, school, store, and dwelling were all destroyed. After moving over rural, low-lying farmland, the tornado demolished portions of Marble Plains. One home in this area was swept away, killing the two occupants. The tornado then moved into Roark Creek, where several homes and two barns were leveled. After passing through another rural, forested area, the tornado roared into the north side of Decherd, where more heavy destruction and another fatality occurred. There were 15 homes destroyed and 50 others damaged while 85 other buildings were damaged or destroyed. Five freight cars on the Nashville, Chattanooga and St. Louis Railway were derailed and scattered along the right of way in the town as well. The tornado dissipated shortly afterwards. In all, 109 farms reported damage, three people were killed, 44 others were injured, and damages totaled $500,000.

Non-tornadic impacts
Most of the damage during this event was either by tornadoes or the storm that produced it. However, one isolated report of large hail was recorded in Warren, Mississippi. Windows were broken, automobiles were dented, and gardens and winter grains were damaged.

See also
 List of North American tornadoes and tornado outbreaks
 List of F4 and EF4 tornadoes

Notes

References

Tornadoes of 1952
F4 tornadoes
Tornadoes in Louisiana
Tornadoes in Arkansas
Tornadoes in Tennessee
Tornadoes in Missouri
Tornadoes in Mississippi
Tornadoes in Alabama
1952 in Louisiana
1952 in Arkansas
1952 in Tennessee
1952 in Missouri
1952 in Mississippi
1952 in Alabama